The North Carolina Tar Heels are the intercollegiate athletic teams that represent the University of North Carolina at Chapel Hill. The name Tar Heel is a nickname used to refer to individuals from the state of North Carolina, the Tar Heel State. The campus at Chapel Hill is referred to as the University of North Carolina for the purposes of the National Collegiate Athletic Association. The University of North Carolina at Chapel Hill was chartered in 1789, and in 1795 it became the first state-supported university in the United States. Since the school fostered the oldest collegiate team in the Carolinas, the school took on the nickname Carolina, especially in athletics. The Tar Heels are also referred to as UNC or The Heels.

The mascot of the Tar Heels is Rameses, a Dorset Ram. It is represented as either a live Dorset sheep with its horns painted Carolina Blue, or as a costumed character performed by a volunteer from the student body, usually an undergraduate student associated with the cheerleading team.

Carolina has won 47 NCAA Division I team national championships in seven different sports, eighth all-time, and 52 individual national championships.

Sports sponsored

Baseball

 Head Coach: Scott Forbes
 Stadium: Bryson Field at Boshamer Stadium
 ACC Championships: 9 (1982, 1983, 1984, 1990, 2007, 2013, 2018, 2019, 2022)
 College World Series appearances: 11 (1960, 1966, 1978, 1988, 2006, 2007, 2008, 2009, 2011, 2013, 2018)

Also nicknamed the Diamond Heels, Carolina's baseball team has appeared in the College World Series eleven times. They have reached the championship series twice (2006 and 2007), losing  to Oregon State on both occasions.

Men's basketball

 Head Coach: Hubert Davis
 Arena: Dean E. Smith Center
 Southern Conference Championships: 13 (Tournament: 1922, 1924 (undefeated), 1925, 1926, 1935, 1936, 1940, 1945; Regular Season: 1935, 1938, 1941, 1944, 1946)
 ACC  Regular Season Championships: 32 (1956, 1957, 1959, 1960, 1961, 1967, 1968, 1969, 1971, 1972, 1976, 1977, 1978, 1979, 1982, 1983, 1984, 1985, 1987, 1988, 1993, 1995, 2001, 2005, 2007, 2008, 2009, 2011, 2012, 2016, 2017, 2019
 ACC Tournament Championships: 18 (1957, 1967, 1968, 1969, 1972, 1975, 1977, 1979, 1981, 1982, 1989, 1991, 1994, 1997, 1998, 2007, 2008, 2016)
 NCAA National Championships: 6 (1957, 1982, 1993, 2005, 2009, 2017)
 Pre-Tournament Claimed National Championships: 1 (1924)
 Postseason Invitational Championships: 1 (1971)
 NCAA Final Four Appearances: 21 (1946, 1957, 1967, 1968, 1969, 1972, 1977, 1981, 1982, 1991, 1993, 1995, 1997, 1998, 2000, 2005, 2008, 2009, 2016, 2017, 2022)
 Best Final Ranking: No. 1 (Associated Press: 1957, 1982, 1984, 1994, 1998, 2008, 2009; Coaches: 1957, 1982, 1984, 1993, 2005, 2009, 2017)
 National Players of the Year: 8 (Jack Cobb 1923–26, George Glamack 1938–41, Lennie Rosenbluth 1954–57, Phil Ford 1974–78, James Worthy 1979–82, Michael Jordan 1981–1984, Antawn Jamison 1995–98, Tyler Hansbrough 2005–09).

Carolina has enjoyed long success as one of the top basketball programs in the country. The program claims 7 national championship teams, six NCAA National Championships and one retroactive championship, for the 1924. This championship was awarded by the Helms Foundation and the Premo-Porretta Power Poll.

Under coach Frank McGuire, the Tar Heels won one national championship in 1957. The 1956-57 team went undefeated on their way to the school's first NCAA tournament championship.

After McGuire departed in scandal, Dean Smith, who had been an assistant under McGuire, was hired to de-emphasize basketball in response. Instead, after some struggles early in his tenure, Smith ultimately entrenched the Tar Heels as a basketball powerhouse over his 36 years as head coach. At the time of his retirement, Smith's 879 wins set the record for the most wins of any men's college basketball head coach. Under Smith, the Tar Heels won two national championships, 13 ACC Tournament championships, and one NIT Championship. Smith is also credited with popularizing the four corners, which he employed expertly until the dawn of the shot clock in college basketball. Smith also is credited with developing the idea of "The Carolina Way," epitomized by his motto of "Play hard, play smart, play together," and by other team-oriented practices Smith developed, including "point to the passer," where the player who scores a basket thanks his teammate for the assist. 

In 2003, Roy Williams, an assistant under Smith from 1978-88 and the head coach of Kansas, returned to his alma mater after the resignation of head coach Matt Doherty, who struggled during his three seasons at the helm. In Williams' second season, the Tar Heels won the 2005 NCAA national championship. Williams would go on to win two more national titles (2009 and 2017) in his 18 seasons as Tar Heel head coach. He finished his career with 903 wins, 485 of which came in Chapel Hill.

Williams retired on April 1st, 2021, and was replaced by assistant coach Hubert Davis. Davis, who played for Tar Heels from 1988-92 under Smith, also had a lengthy career as an NBA player, and spent several seasons as an analyst for ESPN before being hired by Williams as an assistant coach in 2012. He became the first African American head coach for UNC men's basketball, and led the team to its NCAA-record 21st final four in the 2021-22 season,

JV Basketball
North Carolina is one of the few remaining Division I schools to sponsor a junior varsity basketball team. The JV Tar Heels play games against community colleges and preparatory schools. Current varsity head coach Hubert Davis coached the JV team for several seasons, and Roy Williams also served a stint as JV head coach when he was an assistant under Dean Smith.

Women's basketball

 Head coach: Courtney Banghart
 Arena: Carmichael Arena
 ACC Regular Season Championships: 4 (1997, 2005, 2006, 2008)
 ACC Tournament Championships: 9 (1984, 1994, 1995, 1997, 1998, 2005, 2006, 2007, 2008)
 Final Four Appearances: 3 (1994, 2006, 2007)
 National Championships: 1 (1994)

Under legendary coach Sylvia Hatchell, North Carolina women's basketball had many successful seasons. Perhaps the most successful season came in 1993-94, when Hatchell's Tar Heels won the NCAA national championship. Following several seasons of downturn, Hatchell resigned after the 2018-19 season.

Coach Hatchell was replaced by Courtney Banghart, who immediately began to rebuild the program. In her four seasons as head coach, Banghart has begun to raise the standards of the program back to the national level by recruiting at a high level and making back-to-back NCAA Tournament appearances in 2021 and 2022. The 2022 team reached the NCAA tournament round of sixteen for the first time since 2015.

Field hockey

 Head Coach: Erin Matson
 Stadium: Karen Shelton Stadium
 ACC Championships:  25 (1983, 1984, 1985, 1986, 1987, 1988, 1989, 1990, 1991, 1993, 1994, 1995, 1996, 1997, 2004, 2007, 2011, 2012, 2015, 2017, 2018, 2019, 2020, 2021, 2022)
 National Championships: 10 (1989, 1995, 1996, 1997, 2007, 2009, 2018, 2019, 2020, 2022)

Karen Shelton led the Carolina field hockey program for 42 years prior to her retirement following the 2022 season. She won 10 NCAA national championships and 25 ACC titles, both records for the sport. She was replaced by former star player Erin Matson, who herself was a member of four of UNC's national championship teams (2018-2020, 2022).

Football

 
 Head Coach: Mack Brown
 Stadium: Kenan Memorial Stadium 
 Southern Intercollegiate Athletic Association Championships: 1 (1895)
 Southern Conference Championships: 4 (1922, 1934, 1946, 1949)
 ACC Championships: 5 (1963, 1971, 1972, 1977, 1980)
 ACC Coastal Division Championships: 2 (2012, 2015)
 Postseason Bowl Appearances: 36 (1947 Sugar, 1949 Sugar, 1950 Cotton, 1963 Gator, 1970 Peach, 1971 Gator, 1972 Sun, 1974 Sun, 1976 Peach, 1977 Liberty, 1979 Gator, 1980 Bluebonnet, 1981 Gator, 1982 Sun, 1983 Peach, 1986 Aloha, 1993 Peach, 1993 Gator, 1994 Sun, 1995 Carquest, 1997 Gator, 1998 Gator, 1998 Las Vegas, 2001 Peach, 2004 Continental Tire, 2008 Meineke Car Care, 2009 Meineke Car Care, 2010 Music City, 2011 Independence, 2013 Belk, 2014 Quick Lane, 2015 Russell Athletic, 2016 Sun, 2019 Military, 2021 Orange Bowl – January, 2021 Duke's Mayo Bowl)
 Best Final Ranking: No. 3 (1948 Associated Press)

Men's lacrosse

 Head coach: Joe Breschi
 Home fields: Dorrance Field
 ACC tournament championships: 1989, 1990, 1991, 1992, 1993, 1994, 1996, 2013, 2017
 ACC regular season championships: 1981, 1982, 1985, 1988, 1991, 1992, 1994, 1996, 2016, 2021
 NCAA tournament appearances: 1976, 1977, 1980, 1981, 1982, 1983, 1984, 1985, 1986, 1987, 1988, 1989, 1990, 1991, 1992, 1993, 1994, 1995, 1996, 1998, 2004, 2007, 2008, 2009, 2010, 2011, 2012, 2013, 2014, 2015, 2016, 2017, 2021
 NCAA tournament Final Four appearances: 14 (1980, 1981, 1982, 1983, 1984, 1985, 1986, 1989, 1990, 1991, 1992, 1993, 2016, 2021)
 NCAA tournament championships: 5 (1981, 1982, 1986, 1991, 2016)

Women's lacrosse

Head Coach: Jenny Levy
Home fields: Dorrance Field
ACC tournament championships: 2002, 2016, 2017, 2018, 2019, 2021, 2022
 NCAA Tournament appearances: 1997, 1998, 1999, 2000, 2001, 2002, 2005, 2006, 2007, 2008, 2009, 2010, 2011, 2012, 2013, 2014, 2015, 2016, 2017, 2018, 2019, 2021, 2022
 NCAA Tournament Final Four appearances: 13 (1997, 1998, 2002, 2009, 2010, 2011, 2013, 2015, 2016, 2018, 2019, 2021, 2022)
 NCAA Championships: 3 (2013, 2016, 2022)

Men's soccer

 Head Coach: Carlos Somoano
 Stadium: Dorrance Field
 ACC Tournament Championships: 1987, 2000, 2011
 College Cup Appearances: 1987, 2001, 2008, 2009, 2010, 2011, 2016, 2017, 2021 (spring)
 NCAA National Championships: 2 (2001, 2011)

Women's soccer

 Head Coach: Anson Dorrance
 Stadium: Dorrance Field
 ACC Championships:  38 (1989, 1990, 1991, 1992, 1993, 1994, 1995, 1996, 1997, 1998, 1999, 2000, 2001, 2002, 2003, 2005, 2006, 2007, 2008, 2009 Tournament, 1987, 1989, 1990, 1991, 1992, 1993, 1995, 1996, 1997, 1998, 1999, 2001, 2002, 2003, 2004, 2005, 2006, 2007, 2008, 2010 Regular Season)
 National Championships: 22 (1981 AIAW, 1982, 1983, 1984, 1986, 1987, 1988, 1989, 1990, 1991, 1992, 1993, 1994, 1996, 1997, 1999, 2000, 2003, 2006, 2008, 2009, 2012 NCAA)
 College Cup Appearances: 26 (1982, 1983, 1984, 1985, 1986, 1987, 1988, 1989, 1990, 1991, 1992, 1993, 1994, 1995, 1996, 1997, 1998, 1999, 2000, 2001, 2002, 2003, 2006, 2008, 2009, 2012, 2013, 2014, 2015, 2016, 2017, 2018, 2019, 2020, 2021 (spring), 2022)

Anson Dorrance has coached the women's soccer team at Carolina since its inception in 1979. In his 46 years as head coach, Dorrance has won 38 ACC championships and 22 national championships on the way to over 1,000 victories as a head coach. In 2019, following the demolition of Fetzer Field, a new combination soccer and lacrosse stadium was opened on the same site, named Dorrance Field in his honor.

Women's tennis

Jamie Loeb attended UNC for her freshman and sophomore years (2013–15), during which she became the first freshman in close to 30 years to win both the Riviera/ITA Women's All-American Championship (making her the NCAA Women's Singles Tennis National Champion) and the USTA/ITA National Indoor Intercollegiate Championship. She was also the first singles national champion in UNC women's tennis history. In both her freshman and her sophomore seasons she was named Atlantic Coast Conference (ACC) Player of the Year.

The women's tennis program, under head coach Brian Kalbas, won ITA Indoor National Championships in 2013, 2015, 2018, 2020, 2021, 2022, and 2023, becoming one of the more successful programs in collegiate tennis.

Men's golf
The men's golf team has won 14 conference championships:
Southern Conference (3): 1947, 1952, 1953
Atlantic Coast Conference (11): 1956, 1960, 1965, 1977, 1981, 1983–84, 1986, 1995–96, 2006 (co-champion)

Two Tar Heels have won the NCAA individual championship, Harvie Ward in 1949 and John Inman in 1984. Ward also won the British Amateur in 1952 and the U.S. Amateur in 1955 and 1956. The team's best finish was second place in 1953 and 1991.

Tar Heel golfers who have had success at the professional level include Davis Love III (20 PGA Tour wins including 1997 PGA Championship) and Mark Wilson (five PGA Tour wins).

Wrestling
Following Coach Sam Barnes who built the modern wrestling program at UNC (1953–1971), Head coach Bill Lam led the Tar Heel wrestling program for 30 years until his retirement in 2002, where his former wrestler and 1982 NCAA Champion, C.D. Mock, became his replacement. Under Lam, the Tar Heels were a consistent top 25 NCAA team. Lam led the Tar Heels to 15 ACC tournament titles in addition to being named ACC coach of the year 10 times. Following the Lam era, Mock was named ACC Coach of the Year in 2005 and 2006 in addition to claiming two ACC team titles. In 2015, Mock was fired as head wrestling coach for defending his son against a false sexual assault allegation. He was replaced by Olympic bronze medalist and Oklahoma State University graduate Coleman Scott.

The Tar Heel wrestling program boasts many ACC champions, All-Americans, and has 4 individual NCAA champions, with 7 championships amongst them: C.D. Mock (1982), Rob Koll (1988), T.J. Jaworsky (1993, 1994, 1995), and Austin O'Connor (2021, 2023). Jaworsky is known as one of the greatest college wrestlers of all time as he is the first and only ACC wrestler to win three NCAA titles in addition to winning the inaugural Dan Hodge Trophy, given to college wrestling's most dominant wrestler. Koll is now the head coach at Cornell University where he has led the program to new heights with multiple top 10 NCAA finishes.

UNC wrestling All-Americans include: C.D. Mock, Dave Cook, Jan Michaels, Bob Monaghan, Mike Elinsky, Rob Koll, Bobby Shriner, Tad Wilson, Al Palacio, Lenny Bernstein, Doug Wyland, Enzo Catullo, Pete Welch, Shane Camera, Jody Staylor, Marc Taylor, Stan Banks, Justin Harty, Evan Sola, Chris Rodrigues, Evan Henderson, Ethan Ramos, and Joey Ward.

Other notable alumni include C.C. Fisher, a 1998 ACC champion and Most Outstanding Wrestler, who went on to become a successful wrestler on the international stage, where he was as high as second on the United States Olympic latter. Fisher also went on to become a successful coach for multiple Division I wrestling programs including Iowa State and Stanford. Also, the late Sen. Paul Wellstone attended the University of North Carolina at Chapel Hill (UNC) on a wrestling scholarship. In college he was an undefeated ACC wrestling champion.

The Tar Heel wrestling program has won 17 total ACC championships: 1979, 1980, 1984, 1985, 1986, 1987, 1992, 1993, 1994, 1995, 1997, 1998, 1999, 2000, 2003, 2005 and 2006

UNC's best finish at the NCAA tournament was 5th in 1982. They also took 6th in 1995.

Carmichael Arena is currently the home to the Tar Heels Wrestling team, located centrally on campus.

Women's rowing
Head Coaches - Thomas Revelle, Emilie Gross

Founded 1997/98 season

Other sports

Other national championship victories include the women's team handball team in 2004, 2009, 2010, 2011; and the men's handball team in 2004, 2005, and 2006. The men's crew won the 2004 ECAC National Invitational Collegiate Regatta in the varsity eight category. In 1994, Carolina's athletic programs won the Sears Directors Cup which is awarded for cumulative performance in NCAA competition.

Rugby
Carolina also fields non varsity sports teams.  North Carolina's rugby team competes in the Atlantic Coast Rugby League against its traditional ACC rivals. North Carolina Men's Rugby finished second in its conference in 2010, led by conference co-player of the year Alex Lee. The North Carolina Men finished second at the Atlantic Coast Invitational in 2009 and again in 2010. North Carolina has also competed in the Collegiate Rugby Championship, finishing 11th in 2011 in a tournament broadcast live on NBC.

The North Carolina Women's Rugby Team is a Division 1 team competing in the Blue Ridge Rugby Conference and has repeatedly competed at the National Level, including a run at the Final Four in 2016. Notable Alumni of UNC Women's Rugby include All-American Emily Pratt (Second team 2003, First team 2006), All-American Kira Cervenka (First team 2004-5), All-American and US 7s National player Katie Lorenz (Second team 2010, 2011–present), and All-American and professional US 7s National player Kimber Rozier (First team 2011, 2011–present). Current distinguished players include U20 National team winger Holly Zoeller (2010–11) and U23 South All-Stars Jessica Meidinger (2011) and Carrie Moss (2010-11). Alumni Kimber Rozier and Naya Taper play on the USA Nationals 15s Team, with Tapper having competed in the 2020 Tokyo Olympics.

Ultimate 
North Carolina’s Ultimate (sport) teams compete nationally in USA Ultimate’s College division.  The men’s team, Darkside, won national championships in 2015, 2018, 2021, and 2022.  The women's team, Pleiades, also won back-to-back national championships in 2021 and 2022.  Individuals on both Darkside and Pleiades have won the Callahan Award, a collegiate MVP award determined by a vote of their peers.  Callahan winners include Leila Tunnell (2011), Jonathan Nethercutt (2015), Matt Goechoe-Hanas (2019), Anne Worth (2020), and Dawn Culton (2022).

Championships

NCAA team championships
North Carolina has won 48 NCAA team national championships.

Men's (13)
Basketball (6): 1957, 1982, 1993, 2005, 2009, 2017
Lacrosse (5): 1981, 1982, 1986, 1991, 2016
Soccer (2): 2001, 2011
Women's (35)
Basketball (1): 1994
Field Hockey (10): 1985, 1995, 1996, 1997, 2007, 2009, 2018, 2019, 2020, 2022
Lacrosse (3): 2013, 2016, 2022
Soccer (21): 1982, 1983, 1984, 1986, 1987, 1988, 1989, 1990, 1991, 1992, 1993, 1994, 1996, 1997, 1999, 2000, 2003, 2006, 2008, 2009, 2012
see also:
ACC NCAA team championships
List of NCAA schools with the most NCAA Division I championships

Other national team championships
Below are 24 national team titles that were not bestowed by the NCAA:
 Men's:
Basketball (1): 1924*
Team Handball (3): 2004, 2005, 2006
Tennis (2): 2016***, 2021***
Ultimate (4) : 2015****, 2018****, 2021****, 2022****
 Women's:
Soccer (1): 1981**
Team Handball (4): 2004, 2009, 2010, 2011
Tennis (7): 2013***, 2015***, 2018***, 2020***, 2021***, 2022***, 2023 ***
Ultimate (2): 2021****, 2022****

(*) Pre-NCAA tournament title (retrospectively selected by Helms Foundation in 1943 and Premo-Porretta Power Poll in 1995.)
(**) There was only one AIAW soccer tournament, thus making North Carolina the only women's soccer team to win an AIAW championship
(***) ITA National Team Indoor Championships
(****) USA Ultimate College Championships

see also:
List of NCAA schools with the most Division I national championships

Rivalries

Carolina's most heated rivalries are with its Tobacco Road counterparts Duke, North Carolina State, and Wake Forest. In recent years, the Carolina-Duke basketball series has attracted the most attention. HBO even made a documentary in 2009 called "Battle for Tobacco Road: Duke vs. Carolina". The Tar Heels also have a rivalry with Virginia in college football, known as the South's Oldest Rivalry. UNC and UVA are the two oldest schools in the Atlantic Coast Conference.

North Carolina Cheer

I'm a Tar Heel Born
Carolina's main fight song is  I'm a Tar Heel Born.  Its lyrics appear in the 1907 edition of the university's yearbook, the "Yackety Yack," although how long it existed before that is not known. Some say that it was in the late 1920s that it began to be sung as an add-on (or "tag") to the school's alma mater, "Hark The Sound", although the current version of the sheet music for "Hark the Sound" includes the "I'm a Tar Heel Born" tag as an integral part of the alma mater and credits the full song to William Starr Myers with a date of 1897. Today, the song is almost always played immediately after the singing of "Hark The Sound", even during more formal occasions such as convocation and commencement. Just before home football and basketball games, the song is played by the Bell Tower near the center of campus, and is often played after major victories.

As it appears in its 1907 printed form, the final words of the song are "Rah, rah, rah!" Starting in the 1960s, however, "Rah, rah, rah!" was "unofficially" replaced with "Go to hell, State!"; NC State was UNC's main athletic rival for much of the first half of the 20th century. From the late 1980s onward, the "unofficial" final lyrics have been "Go to hell, Duke!"; reflecting Duke eclipsing State as Carolina's main rival.

Simply known as "Tag" by many Marching Tar Heel alumni, and titled as such on some recorded albums, "I'm a Tar Heel Born" has been adopted by at least three other colleges for their use, including the University of Rhode Island, the University of Richmond, and Brown University (see ).

Here Comes Carolina
Another popular song is Here Comes Carolina.

As its title implies, it is most commonly played when a Tar Heel team enters the field of play.  Traditionally, the band plays a version of the traditional orchestral warmup tune before launching into the song when the first player charges out of the tunnel.  During the warmup tune, fans stand and clap along.  The effect is similar to that of a train coming down the track.

From the early 1990s to around 2004 at basketball games, the band played the first seven notes of the song in different keys during player introductions, modulating a half step each time before launching into the song in the normal key after the final player was announced.

The last part of the song's melody come from an old revival song, "Jesus Loves the Little Children".

Notable alumni

Notable graduates from the athletic programs include Michael Jordan from men's basketball, Mia Hamm from women's soccer, Charlie Justice from American football, Davis Love III from golf, B.J. Surhoff from baseball and Marion Jones from women's basketball and track & field.

References

External links